Plymouth Municipal Airport  is a town-owned, public-use airport located four nautical miles (7 km) southwest of the central business district of Plymouth, a town in Plymouth County, Massachusetts, United States. According to the FAA's National Plan of Integrated Airport Systems for 2009–2013, it is categorized as a general aviation airport. Due to space issues, the airport has 2 gates in Carver, Massachusetts.

The field was originally Naval Outlying Landing Field Plymouth, a Naval Outlying Landing Field located in Plymouth, Massachusetts operational from 1942 to 1945. It existed as an outlying field of Naval Air Station Squantum (as well as nearby Naval Air Station Quonset Point in December 1944) and was used by student pilots to gain flight experience on its two 4,300-foot turf runways.

Facilities and aircraft 

For the 12-month period ending July 14, 2016, the airport had an average of 139 operations per day. 59% local general aviation, 39% transient general aviation, 1% air taxi, and <1% military. At that time there were 114 aircraft based at this airport: 96 single-engine, 8 multi-engine, 6 jets and 4 helicopters.

Gallery

References

External links
Aerial photo as of 10 March 1995 from USGS The National Map via MSR Maps

Airports in Plymouth County, Massachusetts
Buildings and structures in Plymouth, Massachusetts
Plymouth, Massachusetts
Closed installations of the United States Navy